Verna Norberg Aardema Vugteveen (June 6, 1911 – May 11, 2000), best known by the name Verna Aardema, was an American writer of children's books.

Verna Norberg was born in New Era, Michigan. She graduated from Michigan State University with a B.A. of Journalism in 1934.  She worked as a grade school teacher from 1934 to 1973 and became a correspondent for the Muskegon Chronicle in 1951, a job that lasted until 1972, the year before she retired from teaching.

In her senior year at Michigan State, Norberg won three writing contests; although not her first, they were the most influential in her decision to pursue the childhood dream.  She first considered writing for children when her daughter refused to eat until she'd heard one of her mother's stories.  These bribes were often set in the places that she had been reading about recently, and as she became more and more interested in Africa, they began to be set there more frequently.

In 1960, she published her first set of stories, Tales from the Story Hat which were very successful, and so she continued to adapt traditional tales and folklore from distant cultures, (usually from Africa and Mexico) to expose young children to the vast variety of human expression.

Her book, Why Mosquitoes Buzz in People's Ears (1975), illustrated by Leo and Diane Dillon, received the Caldecott Medal in 1976 and the Brooklyn Art Books for Children Award in 1977. Who's in Rabbit's House? 1977 was the 1977 School Library Journal Best Book of the Year and a Lewis Carroll Shelf Award winner in 1978. Aardema received the Children's Reading Round Table Award in 1981, and several of her works have been selected as Notable Books by the American Library Association. Her Oh Kojo! How Could You! won the 1984 Parents' Choice Award for Literature.

Marriages

She first married Albert Aardema (1908-1974) and second Joel Vugteveen.

Death

She died in Fort Myers, Florida and is buried in Norton Cemetery, Norton Shores, Muskegon, Michigan alongside her first husband.

Works

 Anansi Does the Impossible!: An Ashanti Tale. Illustrated by Lisa Desimini. 1st ed. New York: Atheneum Books for Young Readers, 1997.
Anansi and his wife outsmart the Sky God and win back the beloved folktales of their people.

 Anansi Finds a Fool: An Ashanti Tale. Pictures by Bryna Waldman. 1st ed. New York: Dial Books, 1992.
Lazy Anansi seeks to trick someone into doing the heavy work of laying his fish trap, but instead he is fooled into doing the job himself.

 Behind the Back of the Mountain; Black Folktales from Southern Africa. Pictures by Leo and Diane Dillon. New York: Dial Press, 1973.
Ten folk legends from southern Africa include Hottentot, Zulu and Bantu tales.

 Bimwili & the Zimwi: A Tale from Zanzibar. Pictures by Susan Meddaugh. 1st ed. New York: Dial Books, 1985.
A Swahili girl is abducted by a Zimwi and told to be the voice inside his singing drum.

 Borreguita and the Coyote: A Tale from Ayutla, Mexico. Illustrated by Petra Mathers. New York: Knopf; distributed by Random House, 1991.
A little lamb uses her clever wiles to keep a coyote from eating her up.

 Bringing the Rain to Kapiti Plan: A Nandi Tale. Pictures by Beatriz Vidal. New York: Dial Press, 1981.
A cumulative rhyme relating how Ki-pat brought rain to the drought-stricken Kapiti Plain.

 Half-a-Ball-of-Kenki: An Ashanti Tale. With pictures by Diane Stanley Zuromskis. New York: F. Warne, 1979.
Half-a-Ball-of-Kenki rescues Fly from Leopard and, in the ensuing fray, Leopard receives a spotted coat forever.

 How the Ostrich Got Its Long Neck; A Tale from the Akamba of Kenya. Illustrated by Marcia Brown. New York: Scholastic, 1995.
A tale from the Akamba people of Kenya that explains why the ostrich has such a long neck.

 Jackal's Flying Lesson: A Khoikhoi Tale. Illustrated by Dale Gottlieb. New York: Knopf; distributed by Random House, 1995.
With the help of a blue crane, a mother dove rescues her babies from a not-so-clever Jackal.

 Ji-nongo-nongo Means Riddles. Illustrated by Jerry Pinkney. New York: Four Winds Press, 1978.
Presents a collection of riddles from Africa.

 Koi and the Kola Nuts: A Tale from Liberia. Illustrated by Joe Cepeda. 1st ed. New York: Atheneum Books for Young Readers, 1999.
An African folktale in which the son of the chief must make his way in the world with only a sackful of kola nuts and the help of some creatures that he has treated with kindness.

 The Lonely Lioness and the Ostrich Chicks: A Masai Tale. Illustrated by Yumi Heo. New York: A.A. Knopf; distributed by Random House, 1996.
In this retelling of a Maasai tale, a mongoose helps an ostrich get her chicks back from the lonely lioness who has stolen them.

 Misoso: Once Upon a Time Tales from Africa Illustrated by Reynold Ruffins. New York: Knopf; distributed by Random House, 1994.
A collection of folktales from different parts of Africa.

 More Tales from the Story Hat. Illustrated by Elton Fax. New York: Coward-McCann, 1966.
Presents eleven folktales from Africa.

 The Na of Wa. Illustrated by Elton Fax. New York: Coward-McCann, 1960.
 Oh, Kojo! How Could You!: An Ashanti Tale. Pictures by Marc Brown. 1st ed. New York: Dial Books for Young Readers, 1984.
Relates how a young man named Kojo finally gets the better of the tricky Anansi.

 Otwe. Illustrated by Elton Fax. New York: Coward-McCann, 1960.
 Pedro & the Padre: A Tale from Jalisco, Mexico. New York: Dial Books for Young Readers, 1991. 
In this Mexican folktale, a lazy boy learns a lesson about lying.

 Princess Gorilla and a New Kind of Water: A Mpongwe Tale. Pictures by Victoria Chess. 1st ed. New York: Dial Books for Young Readers, 1988.
King Gorilla decrees that no one may marry his daughter until a suitor strong enough to consume a barrel of strange, intoxicating water is found.

 Rabbit Makes a Monkey of Lion: A Swahili Tale Pictures by Jerry Pinkney. 1st ed. New York: Dial Books for Young Readers, 1989.
With the help of his friends Bush-rat and Turtle, smart and nimble Rabbit makes a fool of the mighty but slow-witted king of the forest.

 Sebgugugu the Glutton: A Bantu Tale from Rwanda. Illustrated by Nancy L. Clouse. Grand Rapids, Mich.: W.B. Eerdmans; Trenton, NJ: Africa World Press, 1993.
A greedy poor man tests the patience of Imana, Lord of Rwanda, until he loses everything.

 The Riddle of the Drum: A Tale from Tizapan, Mexico. Illustrated by Tony Chen. New York: Four Winds Press, 1979.
Anxious to keep his daughter from marrying, a king announces that no man may marry his daughter unless he guesses the kind of leather used in a drum made by a wizard.
Sebgugugu the Glutton: A Bantu Tale from Rwanda. Illustrated by Nancy L. Clouse. Grand Rapids,

 Mich.: W.B. Eerdmans; Trenton, NJ: Africa World Press, 1993.
A greedy poor man tests the patience of Imana, Lord of Rwanda, until he loses everything.

 The Sky-god Stories. Illustrated by Elton Fax. New York: Coward-McCann, 1960.
 Tales from the Story Hat. Illustrated by Elton Fax. New York: Coward-McCann, 1960.
A collection of nine folk tales from Africa.

 This for That: A Tonga Tale. Pictures by Victoria Chess. 1st ed. New York: Dial Books for Young Readers, 1997.
 Tales from the Third Ear, from Equatorial Africa. Drawings by Ib Ohlsson. 1st ed. New York: Dutton, 1969.
Nine African folk tales recount the adventures of a lonely lioness, a cunning spider, a lying hyena and others.

 Traveling to Tondo: A Tale of the Knundo of Zaire. Illustrated by Will Hillenbradn. New York: Knopf; distributed by Random House, 1991.
 The Vingananee and the Tree Toad: A Liberian Tale. With illustrations by Ellen Weiss. New York: Puffin Books, 1988; New York: Warne, 1983.
A strange animal called the Vingananee beats up all the other animals and eats their stew until the tiny Tree Toad offers to fight him.

 What's So Funny, Ketu?: A Nuer Tale. Pictures by Marc Brown. New York: Dial Press, 1982.
For saving the life of a snake, Ketu is rewarded by being allowed to hear animals think.

 Who's in Rabbit's House?: A Masai Tale. Pictures by Leo and Diane Dillon. New York: Dial Press, 1977.
Rabbit has a problem - someone is inside her house and won't let her in.

 Why Mosquitoes Buzz in People's Ears: A West African Tale. Pictures by Leo and Diane Dillon. New York: Dial Press, 1975.
A retelling of a traditional West African tale that reveals how the mosquito developed its annoying habit.

See also

Sources
Verna Aardema Bibliography from James Madison University
Contemporary Authors, New Revision Series, vol. 18, pp. 471–472.
Fifth Book of Junior Authors and Illustrators, 1983, pp. 1–2.

External links

 Verna Aardema Papers in the de Grummond Children's Literature Collection —with biographical sketch
 Verna Aardema at Library of Congress Authorities — with 39 catalog records

 

American children's writers
American folklorists
Women folklorists
Folklore writers
African folklore
Writers from Michigan
Michigan State University alumni
People from Oceana County, Michigan
1911 births
2000 deaths